AT&T Plaza is a part of Millennium Park, in Chicago, Illinois.

AT&T Plaza may also refer to:
AT&T Plaza (St. Louis) or AT&T Center, a building in St. Louis, Missouri
One AT&T Plaza or Whitacre Tower, a building in Dallas, Texas
AT&T Plaza, a part of the American Airlines Center, a sports arena in Dallas, Texas